Leamington is a municipality in Essex County, Ontario, Canada.  With a population of 27,595 in the Canada 2016 Census, it forms the second largest urban centre in Windsor-Essex County after Windsor, Ontario. It includes Point Pelee National Park, the southernmost point of mainland Canada.

Known since the 20th century as the "Tomato Capital of Canada", it is the location of a tomato processing factory owned by Highbury-Canco; founded in 1908, the plant was owned until 2014 by the H. J. Heinz Company. Due to its location in the southernmost part of Canada, Leamington uses the motto "Sun Parlour of Canada".

Communities
Besides the town of Leamington itself, the municipality of Leamington comprises a number of villages and hamlets, including  Albuna, Blytheswood, Cherry Lane Estates, Elmdale, Goldsmith, Marentette Beach, Mount Carmel, Oakland, Seacliffe, Wigle, Windfall, Chalmers, Erie Curve, Hillman, Point Pelee and Sturgeon Woods.

History 
Leamington was incorporated as a village in 1876, but by 1869, the European-Canadian settlement already had a population of 350. The community was named after Royal Leamington Spa in England, after having originally been called "Gainesville" or "Gainesborough" for local mill owner William Gaines, and before that, Wilkinson Corners.  It has had a post office since June 1854.

It was a crossroads hamlet with about 300 residents and was first known for its lumber products rather than tomatoes. There was extensive lumbering in western Ontario, as across the river in Michigan and also upper Michigan. There were several docks, and fish were plentiful in Lake Erie, so much so that sturgeon could be speared from the shore and fish was the cheapest food available.

Leamington was a "sundown town," a place where Black people would face violence or harassment if they were in public after dark. In 1930, a group of Black parishioners on a visit to Seacliff Park were ordered to leave Leamington by several town administrators. David Suzuki attests that he was told, upon arrival in Leamington in 1946, that “no colored person has ever stayed here beyond sunset.”

Leamington was also one of the few Canadian municipalities included in the Negro Motorist Green Book, the American publication listing safe businesses for travelling black people.

On 1 January 1999, the town was amalgamated with the surrounding Township of Mersea to form an expanded Town of Leamington. Similar municipal restructuring took place throughout Essex County.

In the early hours of June 6, 2010, an F1 tornado ripped through portions of southern Essex County, stretching from Harrow, through Kingsville, to southern Leamington before dissipating near Point Pelee National Park, creating considerable damage, but no loss of life or any direct injuries. The tornado passed through Leamington, damaging various important landmarks and facilities in town, including the marina.

Climate 
Leamington lies on the 42nd Parallel, the same latitude as Chicago, Boston,  the northern border of California, Rome, and Zaragoza. It is located on the north shore of Lake Erie, which acts to moderate its climate.

Demographics 

Language 

The majority of people from Leamington speak English. According to the 2016 census, 24,070 speak English only, 12,100 male and 11,970 female, 1,655 people speak both English and French, 735 male and 920 female, and 1,330 people speak neither English nor French.

Residents of Leamington include a population of Lebanese, Portuguese and Italian. Mennonite settlers, whose ancestors immigrated from Russia, have also added to the population.

Age 

According to the 2016 census, the median age of people living in Leamington is 41.3 years - for men the age was 39.4 and for women the age was 43.5 years of age.

Immigration 

According to a 2006 survey, 7,485 are immigrants or migrants, and 19,365 people are natives of Canada. The majority of migrants come from Mexico and Jamaica, and are employed as seasonal farm workers through the Temporary foreign worker program in Canada. According to the census, Leamington had the highest percentage of Latin Americans in Canada, with 4.9%.

Transportation 
Leamington has a variety of transportation. Transportation around the city is offered by the Leamington Transit bus system. The town is also connected to the provincial highway network by Highway 3 (to Windsor), and Highway 77 (to Highway 401).

A rail line that Heinz built from its plant to the harbour has been converted to a bicycle path going from the middle of town to the Marina. Two ferries, (MV Jiiman and MV Pelee Islander II) owned by the Owen Sound Transportation Company, run on a regularly scheduled seasonal basis from Leamington to Pelee Island with continuing service on to Sandusky, Ohio.

Economy 

The H. J. Heinz company established a factory in 1908 in Leamington. The Heinz products are shipped from the city with both English and French labels, mostly to the United States. Ketchup and baby food are the main products. In November 2013 Heinz announced that it would close the Leamington plant in 2014, meaning job losses for 740 employees at the plant and hundreds more support workers.

Regional and local businessmen worked to save the plant. A campaign was conducted on Facebook to raise support and funds. As a 54-year-old law in Canada bans the use of tomato paste in tomato juice, thus requiring fresh tomatoes, they arranged a deal whereby Highbury Canco took over the plant in 2014. It produces tomato juice and other products for Heinz. Around 250 workers still process canned products at the over 100-year-old factory.

Leamington has also been known for its greenhouses. Major products of the greenhouse industry, in addition to tomatoes, are peppers, cannabis, cucumbers, roses, and other flowers. Hydroponic farming has been very successfully adopted by many greenhouse operators in Leamington. Historically, tobacco was an important crop in the area. Tobacco production declined in the 1960s and today is virtually nonexistent.

Migrant workers, mostly Mexican and Caribbean seasonal labourers, annually arrive in the region to work in Leamington's greenhouses and farms. Several Mexican and Jamaican shops and a Mexican consulate have opened to serve the migrants.

Leamington became a production site of Aphria, one of Canada's largest medicinal and recreational marijuana greenhouse operators. A merger in December 2020 with Nanaimo, British Columbia-based Tilray, led to the closure of Tilray's production site in Leamington and operations were consolidated at the former Aphria site under the name Tilray.

Healthcare

Erie Shores Healthcare serves the city of Leamington, as well as Essex and Chatham Kent. Opened in 1950, Leamington District Memorial Hospital succeeded two smaller healthcare facilities: Hopewell Hospital (c. 1933) and Cottage Hospital (c. 1920). In mid-December 2016, the hospital formally submitted notice to the Ministry of Health and Long-Term Care, it wished to change its name to Erie Shores Healthcare, and subsequently has been approved.  Other major healthcare needs can be undertaken in nearby Windsor, Ontario.

Education 
English-language public education for kindergarten through secondary school grades in Essex County is administered by the Greater Essex County District School Board, along with the Windsor-Essex Catholic District School Board which oversees English-language Catholic education.

French-language public and Catholic education are overseen by the Conseil scolaire Viamonde and the Conseil scolaire de district des écoles catholiques du Sud-Ouest, respectively.  The scope of all of these organizations includes both the County and the City of Windsor.

Prior to 1998, the Essex County Board of Education operated Anglophone secular public schools.

Elementary 

Leamington has five public elementary schools, Margaret D. Bennie, Queen Elizabeth, Gore Hill, Mount Carmel - Blytheswood Public School and East Mersea.  Leamington has two Catholic elementary schools: Cardinal Carter Middle School and Saint Louis. Leamington also has one French speaking Catholic School, St. Michel. South Shore Christian School is a private elementary school located in Leamington.
Leamington has two main school boards, the Greater Essex County District School Board and the Windsor-Essex Catholic School Board.

Queen of Peace Catholic Elementary School faced closure in February 2016, but was since converted to Cardinal Carter Catholic Middle School.

Mill Street Public School was permanently closed at the conclusion of the 2016–2017 school year.

Secondary 

Leamington has three secondary schools: Leamington District Secondary School (public), Cardinal Carter Catholic High School, and U.M.E.I. (United Mennonite Education Institute).

Parks 

Leamington has several parks including Seacliff Park, the Marina Park, Mersea Park and Garrison Gardens, Henry Park, and Chestnut Park.

As noted, Point Pelee National Park contains the southernmost point on mainland Canada and draws thousands of visitors annually. It is on a flyway of migrating birds and one of the largest annual migrations of monarch butterflies.

Tourism 

Tourism contributes significantly to the economy, and the city has many attractions. Its attractions include cycle paths along the lake and the nearby Point Pelee National Park. It is a major site for migrating birds, especially in the autumn. As such, it plays host to many birdwatchers from Canada, the United States, and around the world. The region is also known for the migration of monarch butterflies, which congregate in the fall at Point Pelee before making their way across Lake Erie on their route to winter quarters in central Mexico.

Leamington has a large marina, as many people engage in sailing and other water sports. The marina also features a promenade that extends from the Marina to the Historical Leamington Dock, a port for ferry services to Pelee Island using the Jiiman and Pelee Islander II.

Annual events and festivals
 Festival of Birds – Every year over 40,000 visitors head to Point Pelee National Park for the Festival of Birds at the beginning of May. Over 300 species of birds migrate through the park every year, providing close up views of birds not seen anywhere else in the country.
 Leamington Fair – For over 170 years, the Leamington District Agricultural Society holds the Fair, typically during the third week in June. The Fair features a Midway full of rides and games, a Demolition Derby, and a variety of contests for arts, crafts, livestock, and food in a classic county fair.
 Music Onthe42 Summer Concert Series – The Music Onthe42 Summer Concert Series that runs from late June to the end of August at the Seacliff Park Amphitheatre. Seven free concerts feature national and local bands of all genres performing Saturday evenings.
 Arts @ The Marina – The South Essex Arts Association/Leamington Arts Centre presents an Annual Outdoor Arts and Crafts Show towards the end of June at the Leamington Municipal Marina.
 Hogs For Hospice – An annual motorcycle rally usually held at the beginning of August. It is centered around Seacliff Park and includes concerts featuring music, and a weekend long craft and vendor show. Proceeds from the weekend are donated to the Leamington Hospice.

The town's water tower, visible for kilometres in the flat southern Ontario landscape, is in the shape and colour of a giant tomato. The former tourist information booth in the centre of town is shaped like a large fibreglass tomato.

Sports 
Leamington Flyers play in the Western Division of the Greater Ontario Junior Hockey League at Highbury Canco Arena
Wheatley Sharks play in the Great Lakes Junior C Hockey League
Southpoint Capitals play in the Ontario Minor Hockey Association (OMHA)
Leamington Barons Baseball
Leamington District Minor Baseball Association - t-ball / baseball / softball for over 500 kids
Leamington Minor Soccer Association has over 800 players every year
Leamington S.C. United Soccer Club, formed in Dec. 2008, has become a major sports club with 10 competitive travelling teams from under-11 to Senior Men's
Sun County Crows play in the Zone 7 of the Ontario Lacrosse Association at Highbury Canco Arena
Velocity Volleyball

Media

Print
Leamington's weekly newspaper is the Southpoint Sun-Journal.  The weekly newspaper that was Leamington Post ceased operations in 2012 after 138 years in publication.

Radio
Leamington is home to two regional commercial radio stations.

Leamington is also served by Weatheradio Canada station VAZ533, transmitting at 162.475 MHz in the weather band.

Television

Notable people 
 Margaret Birch (1921-2020), first female cabinet minister in the Government of Ontario
 Kirk Bowman, former NHL player
 Stephen Eustáquio, pro soccer player
 Lana Gay, radio personality on CIN-FM, and formerly CBC Radio 3
 Bob Hooper (1922-1980), MLB pitcher
 Danny Klassen, former MLB infielder
 Randy Manery, former NHL player
 Darren McCarty, former NHL player
 Billy Raffoul, rock singer-songwriter
 Pat Ribble, former NHL player
 Nino Ricci, author
 Brad Selwood, former NHL player and coach
 Bill Sherk, author
 Lynsay Sands, author
 Wally Tatomir (d. 2022), former equipment manager for the NHL's Carolina Hurricanes
 Rosalie Trombley (1939-2021), music director of AM Top 40 radio station CKLW

In popular culture 
The book Splat! by Eric Walters takes place in Leamington at the tomato festival.

See also 
List of townships in Ontario

Notes

References

External links 

 

 
Lower-tier municipalities in Ontario
Populated places on Lake Erie in Canada